The Rose Garden is a 1989 American drama film directed by Fons Rademakers and written by Paul Hengge. The film stars Liv Ullmann, Maximilian Schell, Peter Fonda, Jan Niklas, Hanns Zischler and Kurt Hübner. The film was released on December 22, 1989, by Cannon Film Distributors.

Plot
A holocaust survivor Aaron Reichenbach (Maximilian Schell) returns to Germany and attacks ex-Nazi officer Arnold Krenn (Kurt Hübner) in a Frankfurt airport. When Arnold files assault charges, a public defender, Gabriele Schlüter-Freund (Liv Ullmann), represents Aaron, expecting a straightforward case. But when Gabriele discovers that Aaron is one of many victims of cruel medical experiments in concentration camps, she resolves to seek justice. Aaron is reunited with his long lost sister who has also survived. At the end of the movie the experimentation on, and execution of 20 Jewish children in the Bullenhuser Damm is revealed.

Cast 
Liv Ullmann as Gabriele
Maximilian Schell as Aaron
Peter Fonda as Herbert
Jan Niklas as Paessler
Hanns Zischler as Eckert
Kurt Hübner as Krenn (Krenn was based on Arnold Strippel)
Georg Marischka as Brinkmann
Gila Almagor as Ruth
Lena Müller as Tina 
Nicolaus Sombart as Judge
Özay Fecht as Mrs. Marques
Achim Ruppel as Klaus
Friedhelm Lehmann as Professor Stauffer
Mareike Carrière as Mrs. Moerbler 
Lutz Weidlich as Schubert
Peter Kortenbach as Emminger
Marco Kröger as Harald 
Hans-Jürgen Schatz as Hrudek
Dagmar Cassens as Dr. Kurth
Horst D. Scheel as Ward Physician
 as SS Doctor
Uwe Schawz as SS Unterscharfuehrer
Rolf Mautz as SS Rottenfuehrer
Martin Hoppe as Young Krenn
Helga Sloop as Old Lady
Helmut Krauss as Taxi Driver
Hans Martin Stier as Patient
Barbara Werz as Frau Hasold
Sylvia Martin as Frau Stülp
Andreas Schmidt as Vladimir
Deirdre Fitzpatrick as Helga
Ines Fridman as Rachel Reichenbach
Evelyn Kussmann as Ruth Reichenbach
Ute Brankatsch as Journalist
Jean-Theo Jost as Court Officer

References

External links 
 

1989 films
1989 drama films
American drama films
Austrian drama films
West German films
English-language Austrian films
English-language German films
Films directed by Fons Rademakers
Golan-Globus films
Films about the aftermath of the Holocaust
Films set in West Germany
1980s English-language films
German drama films
1980s American films
1980s German films